Luft is a surname. Notable people with the surname include:

Arthur Luft (died 2009), Manx judge and politician
Cara Luft, Canadian singer-songwriter
Don Luft (1930–2002), American football player
Joey Luft (1955), American actor
Klaus Luft (born 1941), German businessman
Lorna Luft (born 1952), American actress and singer
Lya Luft (born 1938), Brazilian writer and poet
Molly Luft (1944–2010), German prostitute
Richard Luft (born 1938), American politician
Sidney Luft (1915–2005), American film producer
Stanley J. Luft, American philatelist

German-language surnames
German toponymic surnames
Surnames from nicknames